Tipton Township is one of fourteen townships in Cass County, Indiana, United States. As of the 2010 census, its population was 2,490.

History
Tipton Township was organized in 1840. It was named for Indiana Senator John Tipton.

Pipe Creek Falls Resort was listed on the National Register of Historic Places in 1995.

Geography

Cities and towns
 Onward
 Walton

Adjacent townships
 Miami (north)
 Peru Township, Miami County (northeast)
 Pipe Creek Township, Miami County (east)
 Deer Creek Township, Miami County (southeast)
 Jackson (south)
 Deer Creek (southwest)
 Washington (west)

Major highways
  U.S. Route 35
  Indiana State Road 218

Cemeteries
The township contains five cemeteries: Bowyer, Little Deer Creek, Shaff, Venard and Walton.

References
 United States Census Bureau cartographic boundary files
 U.S. Board on Geographic Names

External links

 Indiana Township Association
 United Township Association of Indiana

Townships in Cass County, Indiana
Townships in Indiana
1840 establishments in Indiana
Populated places established in 1840